Alintuma Nsambu is a Ugandan diplomat and the former state minister for information & communication technology from 2006 until 2011. He was shuffled from the cabinet to Diplomatic Service and replaced by Nyombi Thembo in the cabinet reshuffle of 27 May 2011. He also served as the elected member of Parliament representing Bukoto County East in the Masaka District from 2001 until 2011. During the 2011 national election cycle, he controversially lost to Florence Namayanja, of the Democratic Party.

In 2013, he contested for MP Bukoto South Consistituency in Lwengo District where he narrowly lost to the former Democratic Party secretary the Late Matia Nsubuga Birekerawo. There is a theory that Nsambu's losses were caused by the then Police Chief, Gen.Kale Kaihura who is believed to have manipulated the results. While still a minister, Nsambu is believed to have refused to take a bribe from Kaihura to award an ID production project to his company associates in France. Immediately after the elections, President Museveni named Alintuma Nsambu Uganda's Ambassador to Canada, Cuba and the Bahamas. In 2016, President Museveni posted Nsambu to Algiers as Uganda's Ambassador to the Maghreb region (Tunisia, Morocco, Mauritania, Algeria). Alintuma Nsambu is best remembered for his charity work in establishing computer laboratories in Ugandan schools with the hand of Bill Gates' daughter - Jennifer Gates and with the Bellevue area schools in Washington State. As cabinet Minister, Alintuma Nsambu advised President Museveni to establish a national data bank for the citizens of Uganda and that marked the beginning of the National Identification Project that has enabled every Ugandan adult to have an National ID. As a youthful Minister for ICT, Alintuma Nsambu initiated the Mobile Money policy among Telecos which is now the most popular platform for  transferring money in Uganda.

References

External links
Full Ministerial Cabinet List, June 2006
Full Ministerial Cabinet List, February 2009
Full Ministerial Cabinet List, May 2011

Year of birth missing (living people)
Living people
Government ministers of Uganda
Members of the Parliament of Uganda
Ganda people
People from Masaka District